WildWater Adventure is a water park in Muskegon, Michigan, located next door to Michigan's Adventure, and owned by Cedar Fair, Admission is included in the Michigan's Adventure ticket.

History
WildWater Adventure opened in 1990.  The park carried out an extensive phase in 1997 and added the Snake Pit slide complex, the Mine Shaft family raft ride, two wave pools, and a children's play area. When Cedar Fair purchased the park from Roger Jourden they added cabanas to two of the wave pools and in 2005 added the Funnel of Fear tornado slide. In 2010, Michigan's Adventure announced over Facebook that a new attraction would be added to WildWater Adventure called Beach Party. Following the construction of Beach Party, Wild Water Adventure received a small overhaul in 2017. The children's area Half Pint Paradise was remodeled to include a splash pad and now connected the two halves of the waterpark. The entrance to the Funnel of Fear was moved from the back end of the waterpark to the front.

Slides and attractions 
WildWater Adventure offers a wide variety of water attractions for all guests to enjoy. These attractions include:

Incidents 

 On July 11, 2014, chlorine gas was released into an area of the water park. 27 park visitors were treated and hosed off at the park, while 28 patients were taken to Mercy Health hospitals. All patients were released without any life threatening injuries.

See also 
 List of Cedar Fair water parks

References

External links

 Official website

Cedar Fair water parks
Buildings and structures in Muskegon County, Michigan
Water parks in Michigan
Tourist attractions in Muskegon County, Michigan
Michigan's Adventure
1991 establishments in Michigan